Calpain-5 is a protein that in humans is encoded by the CAPN5 gene.

Calpains are calcium-dependent cysteine proteases involved in signal transduction in a variety of cellular processes. A functional calpain protein consists of an invariant small subunit and 1 of a family of large subunits. CAPN5 is one of the large subunits. Unlike some of the calpains, CAPN5 and CAPN6 lack a calmodulin-like domain IV. Because of the significant similarity to Caenorhabditis elegans sex determination gene tra-3, CAPN5 is also called as HTRA3.

References

Further reading

External links
 The MEROPS online database for peptidases and their inhibitors: C02.011